Rong Yiren (May 1, 1916 – October 26, 2005) was the Vice President of the People's Republic of China from 1993 to 1998 and was heavily involved with the opening of the Chinese economy to western investment. Rong is known both in China and in the Western world as "the Red Capitalist" because his family were some of the few pre-1949 industrialists in Shanghai to have been treated well by the Chinese Communist Party in return for their co-operation with the government of the People's Republic of China.

Biography

Early life

Rong was born on May 1, 1916, in Wuxi, a city near Shanghai in Jiangsu Province. His father Rong Desheng and uncle Rong Zongjing were the founders and operators of a flour and cotton milling business. He graduated with a degree in history from the Christian-run St. John's University. Then he was assigned to manage a part of the family business and he took over the running of all 24 mills upon the death of his elder brother Paul Yung (Rong Yixin) in an air crash on Basalt Island, Hong Kong, on 21 December 1948.

Post Chinese Civil War
At the end of the Chinese Civil War and the founding of the People's Republic of China, Rong chose to stay on the Chinese mainland instead of fleeing to Hong Kong or Taiwan as most businessmen did. His family was allowed to keep their business until 1956, when all private businesses became state-owned. His family was given $6 million in compensation.

In the 1950s, Mao Zedong endorsed him many times for his contributions to the Communist Party. When Korean hostilities broke out, Rong's family contributed substantial amounts of funding along with considerable clothing. He was appointed the vice-mayor of Shanghai in 1957 and Vice Minister of Textiles concurrently since 1959, later served as an economics adviser for the Chinese Communist Party.

Cultural Revolution
During the Cultural Revolution, he was denounced as a "capitalist".  He lost a great deal of his personal wealth and was the target of death threats from the Red Guards, radical youth organizations aligned with the new social and cultural policies of Mao Zedong.  In a situation typical of disgraced government officials, entrepreneurs and intellectuals during the Cultural Revolution, Rong was given a demeaning job as a janitor.  However, he and his family received protection from Zhou Enlai from persecution from the Red Guards. As Rong was not a Communist party member at the time, Zhou was not able to obtain approval from Mao Zedong to protect Rong officially. Instead, Zhou coordinated with Chen Jinhua to place Rong's mansion under the control of Red Guards affiliated with the Ministry of Textiles, who were deeply sympathetic to him and protected him from other Red Guard factions.

Chinese economic reformation
After the death of Mao Zedong and the end of Cultural Revolution, Deng Xiaoping appointed Rong as an advisor for the economic opening of China. He set up the China International Trust and Investment Corp., or CITIC, in 1978, which was responsible for much of the initial western investment in China.

At the height of the pro-democracy movement in 1989, he risked his life by asking the top Chinese leaders to negotiate with the students. A week after the Tiananmen Square Protests of 1989, he called the crackdown “extraordinarily wise and correct.”

He was appointed to the ceremonial post of vice president in 1993.

Later life
Rong retired on March 15, 1998, and died on October 26, 2005. He was listed as one of the richest men in Asia, with a family fortune of $1.9 billion in 2000 (equivalent to $ billion in ). Most of this wealth can be attributed to Rong's son Larry Yung in his role as chair of CITIC Pacific.

Although regarded as a non-Communist during his lifetime, he was a member of Chinese Communist Party since 1985, according to his official obituary in Chinese; yet owing to his request that his membership be unveiled only after his death, almost nobody knew about his status as a communist even after his vice presidency.

Life and death                                                                                                                                                                                  
He died of pneumonia on October 26, 2005, at the age of 89. His funeral was held on November 3, 2005, and he was interred at Overseas Chinese Cemetery. His wife died seven years later and was buried next to him. Less than two years after his death, his friend Bo Yibo died on January 15, 2007.

Personal life 
In 1988 Rong requested Deng to inscribe "" (translated: "Admonish Deception Room") on a plaque to be hung at his sitting room. To avoid using deception as a merchant was his father's motto. This scene is portrayed in drama Deng Xiaoping at History's Crossroads.

He married  in 1937. Yang died on January 8th, 2014, in Hong Kong.

References 
                                                                                                                                                                                                 

1916 births
2005 deaths
CITIC Group people
Chinese Communist Party politicians from Jiangsu
Vice presidents of the People's Republic of China
Politicians from Wuxi
People's Republic of China politicians from Jiangsu
St. John's University, Shanghai alumni
Hong Kong Basic Law Drafting Committee members
Jinan University
Businesspeople from Wuxi
People of the Republic of China
Vice Chairpersons of the National People's Congress
Vice Chairpersons of the National Committee of the Chinese People's Political Consultative Conference